Amateur Poker may refer to:

 Amateur Poker Association & Tour, a European organization
 Amateur Poker League, in the US